State Route 126 (SR 126) is an  state highway in Montgomery County, in the central part of the U.S. state of Alabama. The highway serves as both the northern and southern frontage roads between exits 11 and 16 along Interstate 85 (I-85) and U.S. Route 80 (US 80). Prior to US 80's realignment onto I-85 in November 2010, SR 126 was only the northern frontage road. SR 126 begins at itself, a consequence of the realignment as it forms a complete loop. A  spur from the route's beginning marks the end of the route.

Route description
SR 126 is a two-lane highway that travels parallel to I-85 and US 80. SR 126 is routed directly north of the southbound lanes of I-85/US-80 and south of its northbound lanes. SR 126 is in clear view of I-85 and US 80 between mileposts 12 and 21 along I-85. The route north of I-85 is the original section of the highway.

History

When US 80 was rerouted onto I-85, SR 126 was extended to travel along the original route of US 80, which was the roadway paralleling the northbound lanes of I-85.

Major intersections

See also

References

External links

126
Transportation in Montgomery County, Alabama
Highways in Montgomery, Alabama
U.S. Route 80